Michael Winn is an author and teacher most notable for his work with Mantak Chia. He is also known for his occult writings focused on the integration of Taoist qigong and neidan, Tao inner alchemy.

Association with Mantak Chia

Michael Winn was part of a core group of Western esoteric students taught by Mantak Chia. Winn is the most notable of these students, going on to found the Healing Tao University in upstate New York and providing support for local centers in metropolitan areas throughout North America.

Seminars and teaching activity
Winn adapted Chia's Healing Dao teachings with some differences in practice and philosophy. His annual summer retreat, which features Mantak Chia as an invited speaker, and a dozen other top masters of various Taoist arts ranging from energy healing, sexual energy cultivation, medical qigong, Water and Fire inner alchemy, and tai chi /martial arts. For full length bio of Michael Winn, read http://www.healingtaousa.com/winn_iswho.html.

Works
 Chia, Mantak; Winn, Michael Taoist secrets of love: cultivating male sexual energy.  323 p.  URL: http://www.slideshare.net/mantakchia/mantak-chia-taoist-secrets-of-love

Further reading
 Kohn, Livia. Chinese Healing Exercises: The Tradition of Daoyin. University of Hawaii Press, 2008. .
 Miller, James. Chinese religions in contemporary society. ABC-CLIO, 2006. .

References

Year of birth missing (living people)
Living people
American health and wellness writers
American Taoists